Constance Radfan  (born ) was a German female volleyball player.

She was part of the Germany women's national volleyball team and competed at the 1996 Summer Olympics. On club level she played with CJD Berlino.

Clubs
 CJD Berlino (1994)

References

External links
Constance Radfan at Sports Reference
http://www.berliner-zeitung.de/die-volleyballerinnen-susanne-lahme-und-constance-radfan-wechseln-zu-neuen-klubs-exotik-und-liebe-als-umzugsgruende-16956586
https://www.neues-deutschland.de/artikel/511118.stamm-lernte-in-der-ddr.html
https://www.welt.de/print-welt/article651638/Nostalgie-als-spezielle-Motivation.html

1969 births
Living people
German women's volleyball players
Place of birth missing (living people)
Volleyball players at the 1996 Summer Olympics
Olympic volleyball players of Germany